Babel is a 2006 psychological drama film directed by Alejandro González Iñárritu and written by Guillermo Arriaga. The multi-narrative drama features an ensemble cast and portrays interwoven stories taking place in Morocco, Japan, Mexico, and the United States. An international co-production among companies based in the United States, Mexico and France, the film completes Arriaga's and Iñárritu's Death Trilogy, following Amores perros (2000) and 21 Grams (2003).  

Babel was selected to compete for the Palme d'Or at the 2006 Cannes Film Festival, where González Iñárritu won the Best Director Award. The film was later screened at the Toronto International Film Festival. It opened in selected cities in the United States on 27 October 2006, and went into wide release on 10 November 2006. Babel received positive reviews and was a financial success, grossing $135 million worldwide. It won the Golden Globe Award for Best Motion Picture – Drama, and received seven Academy Award nominations, including Best Picture, Best Director, and Best Supporting Actress for Adriana Barraza and Rinko Kikuchi, winning for Best Original Score.

Plot 
Babel has four main strains of actions and characters which are location-based. The film is not edited in a linear chronological order.

Morocco 
In a desert in Morocco, Abdullah, a goatherder, buys a .270 Winchester M70 rifle and a box of ammunition from his neighbor Hassan Ibrahim to shoot the jackals that have been preying on his goats. Abdullah gives the rifle to his two young sons, Yussef and Ahmed, and sends them out to tend to the herd. Doubtful of the rifle's purported three-kilometer range, the two decide to test it out, aiming at rocks, a moving car on a highway below, and then at a bus carrying Western tourists. Yussef's bullet hits the bus, critically wounding Susan Jones, an American woman who is traveling with her husband Richard on vacation. The two boys realize what has happened and flee the scene, hiding the rifle in the hills.

Glimpses of television news programs reveal that the US government considers the shooting a terrorist act and is pressuring the Moroccan government to apprehend the culprits. Abdullah, who has heard about the shooting, asks the boys where the rifle is and beats the truth out of them. Finally, the three try to flee but are spotted. The police corner the father and boys on the rocky slope of a hill and open fire. After Ahmed is hit in the leg, Yussef returns fire, striking one police officer in the shoulder. The police continue shooting, hitting Ahmed in the back, severely injuring him. Yussef then surrenders, admitting responsibility for shooting the American and asking for medical assistance; the police are shocked to realise they were shooting at children.

Richard/Susan 
Richard and Susan are an American couple who came on vacation to Morocco. When Susan is shot on the tour bus, Richard orders the bus driver to the nearest village, Tazarine. The other tourists wait for some time, but they eventually demand to leave, fearing the heat and that they may be the target of further attacks. Richard tells the tour group to wait for the ambulance, which never arrives, and eventually the bus leaves without them. The couple stays behind with the bus's tour guide, still waiting for transport to a hospital. A helicopter arrives and carries Richard and Susan to a hospital in Casablanca, where she is expected to recover.

United States/Mexico 
Richard and Susan's Mexican nanny, Amelia, tends to their children, Debbie and Mike, in their San Diego, California home. When Amelia learns of Susan's injury, she is forced to take care of the children longer than planned and worries that she will miss her son's wedding. Unable to secure any other help to care for them, she calls Richard for advice, who tells her that she has to stay with the children. Without his permission, Amelia decides to take the children with her to the wedding in a rural community near Tijuana, Mexico. Rather than staying the night in Mexico with the children, Amelia decides to drive back to the States with her nephew, Santiago. He has been drinking heavily and the border guards become suspicious of him and the American children in the car. Amelia has passports for all four travellers, but no letter of consent from the children's parents allowing her to take them out of the United States. Irritated by the US Border Patrol officer who does not want to listen to his explanation, Santiago drives away and soon abandons Amelia and the children in the desert.

Amelia leaves the children behind to find help, ordering them not to move. She eventually finds a Border Patrol officer, who places her under arrest. She and the officer travel back to where she left the children, but they are not there. Amelia is taken back to a Border Patrol station, where she is eventually informed that the children have been found and that Richard, while outraged, has agreed not to press charges. However, she is told she will be deported from the US where she has been working illegally. At the border, a tearful Amelia is greeted by her son.

Japan 
Chieko Wataya (綿谷 千恵子 Wataya Chieko) is a rebellious teenage girl who is deaf and non-verbal. She is also self-conscious and unhappy because of her disability. While out with friends, she finds a teenage boy attractive, and following an unsuccessful attempt at socializing, exposes herself to him under a table. At a dental appointment, she tries to kiss the dentist, who sends her away. Chieko encounters two police detectives who question her about her father. She invites one of the detectives, Kenji Mamiya (真宮 賢治 Mamiya Kenji), back to the high-rise apartment that she shares with her father. Incorrectly assuming that the detectives are investigating her father's involvement in her mother's suicide, she explains to Mamiya that her father was asleep when her mother jumped off the balcony and that she witnessed this herself. The detectives are actually investigating a hunting trip Yasujiro took in Morocco. Soon after learning this, Chieko approaches Mamiya nude and attempts to seduce him. He resists her approaches but comforts her as she bursts into tears.

Leaving the apartment, Mamiya crosses paths with Yasujiro and questions him about the rifle. Yasujiro explains that there was no black market involvement; he gave his rifle as a gift to Hassan, his hunting guide on a trip in Morocco. About to depart, Mamiya offers condolences for the wife's suicide. Yasujiro, however, is confused by the mention of a balcony and angrily replies that his wife shot herself, and that Chieko was the first to discover her. As Mamiya sits in a restaurant, watching news of Susan's recovery, Yasujiro comforts his daughter with a hug as she stands at their balcony in mourning.

Themes  
Babel can be analyzed as a network narrative in which its characters, scattered across the globe, represent different nodes of a network that is connected by various strands. The movie not only incorporates quite a large number of characters but they also are, as is typical for network narratives, equally important. It is noticeable that Babel has multiple protagonists who, as a consequence, make the plot more complex in relation to time and causality.

One of the central connections between all of the main characters is the rifle. Over the course of the movie, the viewer finds out that Yasujiro Wataya visits Morocco for a hunting trip and gives the rifle as a gift to his guide, Hassan Ibrahim, who then sells it to Abdullah from where it gets passed on to his sons. Susan Jones, in turn, is shot with that very same rifle which also has a tragic impact on Amelia Hernández' life. It is observable that "all characters are affected by the connections created between them – connections that influence both their individual trajectories as characters and the overall structure of the plot".

It shows how a single object can serve as a connection between many different characters (or nodes in a network) who do not necessarily need to know each other. Even though the rifle is not passed on any further, it continues to influence the characters' lives in significant ways. This demonstrates how the smallest actions on one side of the world can ultimately lead to a complete change of another person's life elsewhere, without there being any form of direct contact between the two (also see Butterfly effect). 
It also creates a small-world effect, in which "characters will intersect again and again" either directly or indirectly and mostly by accident. As Maria Poulaki observes, characters in network narratives "meet and separate not because of the characters' purposeful actions but as an outcome of pure chance".

Cast 

 Morocco
 Brad Pitt as Richard Jones
 Cate Blanchett as Susan Jones
 Mohamed Akhzam as Anwar
 Peter Wight as Tom
 Harriet Walter as Lilly
 Michael Maloney as James
 Driss Roukhe as Alarid
 Boubker Ait El Caid as Yussef
 Said Tarchani as Ahmed
 Mustapha Rachidi as Abdullah
 Abdelkader Bara as Hassan
 Wahiba Sahmi as Zohra
 Robert Fyfe as Tourist Number 14

 United States/Mexico
 Adriana Barraza as Amelia Hernández
 Gael García Bernal as Santiago
 Elle Fanning as Debbie Jones
 Nathan Gamble as Mike Jones
 Clifton Collins, Jr. as Police Officer at Mexican border.
 Michael Peña as Officer John

 Japan
 Rinko Kikuchi as Chieko Wataya
 Kōji Yakusho as Yasujiro Wataya
 Satoshi Nikaido as Detective Kenji Mamiya
 Yuko Murata as Mitsu
 Shigemitsu Ogi as Dentist Chieko attempts to seduce.
 Ayaka Komatsu as Bikini Model in TV Commercial (uncredited).

Production

Writing
In one of the earlier drafts of the script written by Guillermo Arriaga, the Japanese deaf girl was originally a Spanish girl who had recently become blind.

Earlier the main leading couple problems were infidelities, but a child death was introduced to allow Pitt to understand better his character.

According to Alejandro González Iñárritu the locations of the film played a key role in his life. He made a life changing travel to Morocco at 17. In his previous travels to Japan he was convinced to return with a camera someday, and finally his own move from Mexico to the USA was also present in the film.

Asked about the idea for the film, which is credited to Arriaga and Gonzalez Inarritu, the former said, "It is credited to him because I had this story first placed only in two countries. He asked to have it in four and that’s why he has the ‘idea by’ credit." Asked also if the idea of setting “Babel’s” two other stories in Morocco and Japan was from Gonzalez Iñárritu, Arriaga answered "No, he said put it wherever you want,".

Casting
When the 24-year-old Rinko Kikuchi auditioned for the role of Chieko, Iñarritu was surprised by her talent but was reluctant due to her not being deaf. The casting continued with hundred of actresses in the following nine months but the director kept thinking about Kikuchi, so he decided to give her the role.

At the volleyball match in Tokyo, most of the audience spectators were played by deaf persons.

Brad Pitt backed out of a role in The Departed, which he produced, in order to film Babel.

The film extras portraying migrants in the Mexico shooting were real immigrants hired by the production company.

Funding
Babels $25 million budget came from an array of different sources and investors anchored with Paramount Vantage.

Shooting
Filming locations included Ibaraki and Tokyo in Japan, Mexico (El Carrizo, Sonora, and Tijuana), Morocco (Ouarzazate and Taguenzalt – a Berber village in the foothills of the Atlas Mountains, built into the rocky gorges of the Draa's valley), the US state of California (San Diego), and Drumheller in the Canadian province of Alberta.

Principal photography began using 16mm film on 2 May and wrapped on 1 December 2005. After its completion, director Alejandro González Iñárritu and screenwriter Guillermo Arriaga had a falling-out regarding the authorship of their previous film, 21 Grams. Arriaga argued that cinema is a collaborative medium, and that both he and González Iñárritu are thus the authors of the films they have worked on together. González Iñárritu claimed sole credit as the auteur of those same films, minimizing Arriaga's contribution to the pictures. Following this dispute, Iñárritu banned Arriaga from attending the 2006 Cannes Film Festival screening of Babel, an act for which the director was criticized.

Music 

The film's original score and songs were composed and produced by Gustavo Santaolalla. The closing scene of the film features "Bibo no Aozora" by award-winning composer Ryuichi Sakamoto. The musical score won the Academy Award for Best Original Score and the BAFTA Award for Best Film Music. It was also nominated for the Golden Globe Award for Best Original Score.

Release 
Babel was selected to compete for the Palme d'Or at the 2006 Cannes Film Festival. It was later screened at the Toronto International Film Festival. It opened in selected cities in the United States on 27 October 2006, and went into wide release on 10 November 2006.
When the film was released in Japan in 2007, several moviegoers reported queasiness during a scene in which Rinko Kikuchi's character visits a nightclub filled with strobe lights and flashing colors. In response, distributors administered a health warning describing the scene.

Box office performance 
Released in seven theaters on 27 October 2006, and then released nationwide in 1,251 theaters on 10 November 2006, Babel grossed $34.3 million in North America, and $101 million in the rest of the world, for a worldwide box office total of $135.3 million, against a budget of $25 million. Babel is the highest-grossing film of González Iñárritu's Death Trilogy (including Amores perros and 21 Grams), both in North America and worldwide.

Critical response 
Babel received generally positive reviews. Review aggregation website Rotten Tomatoes gives the film an approval rating of 69% based on 205 reviews, with an average rating of 6.80/10, making the film a "Fresh" on the website's rating system. The critical consensus states that "In Babel, there are no villains, only victims of fate and circumstance. Director Alejandro González Iñarritu weaves four of their woeful stories into this mature and multidimensional film." At Metacritic, the film received a weighted average score of 69/100, based on 38 reviews, which indicates "Generally favorable reviews".

Film critic Roger Ebert included Babel in his The Great Movies list, stating that the film "finds Inarritu in full command of his technique: The writing and editing moves between the stories with full logical and emotional clarity, and the film builds to a stunning impact because it does not hammer us with heroes and villains but asks us to empathize with all of its characters."

Home media 
On 20 February and 21 May 2007, Babel was released on DVD by Paramount Home Entertainment in the United States and the United Kingdom respectively. On 25 September 2007, Paramount re-released the film as a two-disc special edition DVD. The second disc contains a 90-minute 'making of' documentary titled Common Ground: Under Construction Notes. Babel has also been released on the high-definition formats, HD DVD, and Blu-ray Disc.

On its first week of release on DVD in North America (19–25 February 2007), Babel debuted #1 in DVD/Home Video Rentals. Total gross rentals for the week, were estimated at $8.73 million. In the first week of DVD sales, Babel sold 721,000 units, gathering revenue of $12.3 million. By April 2007, 1,650,000 units had been sold, translating to $28.6 million in revenue. In July 2008, its US DVD sales had totaled $31.4 million.

Accolades

See also 
 Hyperlink cinema – the film style of using multiple inter-connected story lines
 List of films featuring the deaf and hard of hearing

References

External links 
 
 
 
 
 
 

2006 films
2000s psychological drama films
Anonymous Content films
American psychological drama films
Mexican drama films
French psychological drama films
French multilingual films
American multilingual films
2000s English-language films
2000s Spanish-language films
2000s Arabic-language films
2000s French-language films
2000s Japanese-language films
Japanese Sign Language films
Berber-language films
Films directed by Alejandro González Iñárritu
Films with screenplays by Guillermo Arriaga
Films with screenplays by Alejandro González Iñárritu
American anthology films
Best Drama Picture Golden Globe winners
Films set in San Diego
Films set in Japan
Films set in Mexico
Films set in Morocco
Films set in Tokyo
Films shot in Mexico
Films shot in Morocco
Films shot in Tijuana
Films shot in Tokyo
Films that won the Best Original Score Academy Award
American nonlinear narrative films
French nonlinear narrative films
Media Rights Capital films
Paramount Pictures films
Paramount Vantage films
Films produced by Steve Golin
Films scored by Gustavo Santaolalla
Hyperlink films
French anthology films
2006 multilingual films
BAFTA winners (films)
2006 drama films
Japan in non-Japanese culture
Films produced by Jon Kilik
Mexican multilingual films
Films shot in 16 mm film
Spanish-language French films
2000s American films
2000s French films
2000s Mexican films
Films about disability
Films shot in San Diego